The Commission for Certification in Geriatric Pharmacy (CCGP) is a non-profit organization which has established a voluntary professional certification program for pharmacists. Pharmacists must pass a written examination to become certified and must re-certify every five years. Candidates are expected to be knowledgeable about principles of geriatric pharmacotherapy and the provision of pharmaceutical care to the elderly.

A pharmacist who is certified in geriatric pharmacy practice is designated as a "Certified Geriatric Pharmacist," and may use the acronym "CGP" as a suffix to their personal name.

CCGP was founded in 1997 by the American Society of Consultant Pharmacists and R. Tim Webster, and it is based in Alexandria, Virginia. As of 2007, CCGP has certified pharmacists in Australia, Canada, Panama, Puerto Rico, Sweden, Singapore, United States and Japan.

As of 2018, CCGP merged with the Board of Pharmacy Specialties and CGP credential is now changed to board certified geriatric pharmacist (BCGP).

External links
Commission for Certification in Geriatric Pharmacy - Home page for CCGP

Pharmacy organizations in the United States
Organizations established in 1997
Medical and health organizations based in Virginia